John Grieve Woods (17 January 1900 – 27 April 1980) was an Australian general practitioner and soldier. Woods was born in Albury, New South Wales and died in Newcastle, New South Wales. He was the son of Dr. William Cleaver Woods, the noted pioneer in Australian radiology and x-rays. Woods was known by many as the Flying Doctor for his years of service in the Royal Flying Doctor Service of Australia.

See also

 John Flynn (minister)

References

Australian general practitioners
Australian military personnel of World War I
Australian Presbyterians
Australian people of English descent
1900 births
1980 deaths
People from Albury, New South Wales
Royal Flying Doctor Service of Australia people